or  (or )  is a French phrase that became a rallying cry for the French Decadent poets of the late 19th century including Charles Baudelaire and Arthur Rimbaud. It will not translate precisely into English, but is usually rendered as "to shock or scandalise the (respectable) middle classes."

The Aesthetes in England, such as Oscar Wilde, shared these same fascinations. This celebration of "unhealthy" and "unnatural" devotion to art and excess has been a continuing cultural theme.

Later, Dada and Surrealism pursued the same intent.

See also

 Cubism
 Deviance (sociology)
 Flash mob
 Futurism
 Grotesque
 Shock value

References

French words and phrases
Slogans
19th-century neologisms
Decadent literature